Oehms Classics is a German classical music label founded in 2003 by Dieter Oehms (born in Manderscheid, Bernkastel-Wittlich in 1941), a former manager for 35 years with DGG/Polygram and Arte Nova/BMG.

References

Classical music record labels
Record labels established in 2003
2003 establishments in Germany